Vanessa E. Wyche is an American engineer and civil servant who became the thirteenth Director of the NASA Johnson Space Center (JSC) in June 2021. Previously, she served as deputy director of JSC since August 2018. As a lead engineer, she assisted the JSC leadership team with policy development, staff relations, strategic planning, and management integration of technical, mission support and communications activities.

Early life and education 
Wyche became interested in science at an early age and had parents who supported her interests in science. She grew up in Conway, South Carolina. When she was a junior in high school, she attended the Governor's School for top students. In 1981, she started attending Clemson University. Wyche holds a Bachelor’s of Science degree in Materials Engineering and a Master’s of Science in Bioengineering from Clemson.

Career 
Wyche began her career at the Food and Drug Administration. Her career with NASA began in 1989. Wyche also served as a Project Manager within the Space and Life Sciences Directorate, where she was responsible for the development and use of suites of hardware systems for medical and microgravity experiments on the space shuttle and the International Space Station. She has led a team of 400 engineers and scientists that are working on how to send human explorers to Mars. She has also worked as the director of the Exploration Integration and Science Directorate at the Johnson Space Center.  On August 8, 2018, Vanessa Wyche was selected as the Johnson Space Center Deputy Director.

Awards and recognition 
Wyche has received the following awards:
 NASA Outstanding Leadership Medal
 Two NASA Achievement Medals
 Rotary Stellar Nomination
 Women@NASA Awardee (2014)
“Women Worth Watching” honoree (2016)
Inducted into Thomas Green Clemson Academy of Engineers and Scientists at Clemson University (2019)

Personal life 
Wyche is married to George Wyche Jr. Esq., has one son, and currently lives in Houston.

References

External links 
 60 Seconds With a NASA Bioengineer: Vanessa Wyche (2016 video)
Coastal Carolina University-2017 Inspiring Woman From South Carolina

People from Conway, South Carolina
NASA people
Clemson University alumni
People from Houston
African-American women engineers
American women engineers
African-American engineers
Year of birth missing (living people)
Living people
21st-century women engineers
21st-century African-American people
21st-century African-American women